Patrice Calméjane (born 6 February 1960 in Montreuil, Seine-Saint-Denis) was a member of the National Assembly of France from 2007 to 2012.  He represented the Seine-Saint-Denis department,  and is a member of the Union for a Popular Movement.

He is also the mayor of the town of Villemomble in the department of Seine-Saint-Denis between 2001 and 2019.

References

1960 births
Living people
People from Montreuil, Seine-Saint-Denis
Rally for the Republic politicians
Union for a Popular Movement politicians
The Popular Right
Mayors of places in Île-de-France
Deputies of the 13th National Assembly of the French Fifth Republic